The following is a list of attacks on state or national high courts or judicial buildings.

See also 

 List of attacks on legislatures

References 

Lists of events
Attacks on government buildings and structures